Stephen Hahn is an American physician who served as the Commissioner of Food and Drugs from 2019 to 2021.

Stephen Hahn may also refer to:
Stephen Hahn (art dealer) (1921–2011), American art dealer and collector
Stephen Hahn, president of the Schell Leather Company
Stephen Hahn, CEO of the Joy 94.9 station
Stephen Hahn, a character in The Flight of the Dove portrayed by Lane Smith

See also
Steven Hahn (born 1951), professor of history at New York University